Viktor Vondryska (born 12 March 2001) is a Slovak football forward who currently plays for Rohožník.

References

External links
 
 
 Futbalnet profile 

2001 births
Living people
Footballers from Bratislava
Association football forwards
Slovak footballers
Slovakia youth international footballers
FK Pohronie players
FK Železiarne Podbrezová players
FC Petržalka players
FC Rohožník players
2. Liga (Slovakia) players
Slovak Super Liga players
Expatriate footballers in Austria
Slovak expatriate sportspeople in Austria